Benjamin Jacob Small Heyn-Johnsen (born 22 August 1993), also known as Benny Jamz or at times Höjer Øye is a Danish-Jamaican rapper and record producer. He has been a member of the B.O.C. rap group collective and of the Molotov Movement (also known as Molo or M.O.L.O.). He is of mixed origin with a Danish father and a Jamaican mother.

Benny Jamz started initially rapping in English. But when he heard other Danish rappers rapping in Danish, he joined in. In 2014, he released the album Brænd System (meaning burn system) with collaboration such as tracks "Brænd System featuring Gilli or "Dumme" (meaning stupid). His album was heavily influenced by politics and social criticism. He also released an album under the pseudonym Höjer Øye (meaning high eyes), an expression he uses in Danish while rapping.

In January 2020 he released his album 1010 which topped Hitlisten Albums Chart for 2 weeks.

Jamz also appeared in the 2014 film Flow by the Iraqi director Fenar Ahmad.

Discography

Albums

Singles

Featured in

Other charted songs

References

Danish rappers
1993 births
Living people
Danish people of Jamaican descent